Louvres is a commune in the Val-d'Oise department in Île-de-France in northern France.

Population

Education
Schools in Louvres include:
 Four preschools (écoles maternelles): Georges Seurat, du Moulin, du Bouteillier, and Delacroix
 Three elementary schools: du Moulin, du Boutellier, and de la Fontaine Sainte-Geneviève
 Two junior high schools: Collège André Malraux and Collège François Mauriac

Nearby senior high schools:
Lycée René Cassin in Gonesse
Lycée Léonard de Vinci in Saint-Witz
Lycée Charles Baudelaire in Fosses

Town partnerships
Louvres fosters partnerships with the following places:
 Bad Sobernheim, Rhineland-Palatinate, Germany

See also
Communes of the Val-d'Oise department

References

External links
Official website 

Association of Mayors of the Val d'Oise 

Communes of Val-d'Oise